Warriors (brand) is a Malaysian corporation that is engaged in the design and manufacturer of football (soccer) equipment and apparel and accessories based in Kota Bharu, Kelantan, Malaysia. In Malaysia, they produce kits and training equipment for Kelantan Football Association since 2012.  They also produce jersey, clothing, kits and training equipment for Malaysia Premier League team, Perlis FA for 2013 season.

Sponsorships

Football
Teams
2012
  Kelantan FA
2013
  Kelantan FA
  Perlis FA
 Nay Pyi Taw
2014
  Kelantan FA
 Nay Pyi Taw
2015
  Kelantan FA

References

External links
Official Website
Soccer Jersey

Sportswear brands
Kelantan FA